Anna-Rosalie Boch (10 February 1848 – 25 February 1936), known as Anna, was a Belgian painter, art collector, and the only female member of the artistic group, Les XX. Born in Saint-Vaast, Hainaut. Anna Boch died in Ixelles in 1936 and is interred there in the Ixelles Cemetery, Brussels, Belgium.

Boch's family was involved in art in different ways. Her father, Frédéric Victor Boch, was a successful manufacturer of porcelain; her brother, Eugène Boch, was a painter, and her cousin, Octave Maus, was an art critic.

Artistic style

Boch participated in the Neo-Impressionist movement. Her early works used a Pointillist technique, but she is best known for her Impressionist style which she adopted for most of her career. A pupil of Isidore Verheyden, she was influenced by Théo van Rysselberghe whom she met in the artistic group, Les XX.

Collecting
Boch actively collected works of art by her contemporaries. She assembled a major collection of Post-Impressionist paintings, which included works by Paul Gauguin, Paul Signac, James Ensor, and Vincent van Gogh. She promoted many young artists, including Van Gogh, whom she admired for his talent and who was a friend of her brother Eugène Boch. La Vigne Rouge (The Red Vineyard), purchased by Anna Boch, is believed to be the only painting Van Gogh sold during his lifetime.  The Anna Boch collection was sold after her death. In her will, she donated the money to pay for the retirement of poor artist friends.

Legacy
140 of her own paintings were left to her godchild, Ida van Haelewijn, the daughter of her gardener. Many of these paintings show Ida van Haelewijn as a little girl in the garden. In 1968, these 140 paintings were purchased by her great nephew Luitwin von Boch, the CEO of Villeroy & Boch Ceramics. The paintings remained in the house of Ida van Haelewijn until her death in 1992. The Anna & Eugène Boch Expo opened 30 March 2011.

Some paintings were also donated by Anna Boch's estate to various museums like the Royal Museums of Fine Arts of Belgium.

Cultural heritage

In 2005, the Belgian historian Dr Therèse Thomas published a catalogue raisonné.

References

Sources
 P. & V. Berko, Dictionary of Belgian painters born between 1750 & 1875, Knokke 1981, p. 51.

External links

   Anna Boch.com - includes painting reproductions
  Newsletter on Anna Boch
 Anna Boch at The Athenaeum

1848 births
1936 deaths
People from La Louvière
Post-impressionist painters
Belgian women painters
Burials at Ixelles Cemetery
19th-century Belgian women artists
20th-century Belgian women artists
19th-century Belgian painters
20th-century Belgian painters